The 1955–1956 New Zealand rugby tour of Great Britain and France was a tour by the New Zealand national rugby league team. New Zealand lost both test series 1–2.

Squad
The team was coached by Harold Tetley and managed by Colin Siddle. Cliff Johnson was originally selected but withdrew and was replaced by Maxwell.

Vern Bakalich scored a then record twenty six tries while on tour.

Match Results and Players' Records (appearances, tries and goals) were printed in the 1956 edition of the Sydney-based publication, E.E. Christensen's Official Rugby League Yearbook.

Fixtures
A full list of fixtures is available at the Rugby League Project website.

The Kiwis were so ravaged by injuries that they only had twelve fully fit players available for the final Test against France.

References

New Zealand national rugby league team tours
Great Britain
Great Britain
New Zealand tour
New Zealand tour
New Zealand tour of Australia
New Zealand tour of Australia
Rugby league tours of Great Britain
Rugby league tours of France